MI Cape Town is a South African professional Twenty20 franchise cricket team that first competed in the SA20 tournament. The team is based in Cape Town, South Africa, and was formed in 2022. The team's home-ground is the Newlands Cricket Ground. The team is coached by Simon Katich.

The franchise is owned by Reliance Industries.

Current squad
The team's squad for the first season of the competition was:
 Players with international caps are listed in bold

Statistics

Most runs

Most wickets

Administration and support staff

References

External links
 Official MI Cape Town website
 MI Cape Town on official SA20 website

Cricket in South Africa
2022 establishments in South Africa
Sport in Cape Town
Cricket clubs established in 2022
Sports clubs in South Africa
SA20
Reliance Sports